The London to New York Air Route is an air route between London, UK, and New York, USA. These two cities are connected by a heavily utilised  air route which has been historically important to transatlantic aviation and is today served by several major airlines (British Airways, Virgin Atlantic, American Airlines, Delta Air Lines and JetBlue Airways). The airports of Heathrow and JFK are the main international airports for the London metropolitan area and New York metropolitan area respectively, the world's two most important global cities. The route sustains the highest number of passenger seat kilometers per annum of any route globally (10.92 billion ASK's were scheduled in 2015). In 2018 British Airways achieved a revenue of $1.16 billion on this route alone, making their operation the highest value airline route globally. The route saw a total traffic figure in 2018 of 3,034,155 (+3.0% on 2017), the busiest of any transatlantic air route.

Prior to the aircraft's retirement British Airways operated a double daily supersonic Concorde service on the route which covered the  distance in a scheduled time of 3 hours 15 minutes westbound and just under 3 hours eastbound.

Passenger statistics
Below is a table of passenger numbers flying between Heathrow and JFK by year as published by the UK CAA.

Records
The fastest time for an airliner on the route is 2 hours 52 minutes and 59 seconds, this was achieved on an eastbound JFK-LHR Concorde service on 7 February 1996.

The current fastest subsonic passenger service on the route was achieved by British Airways on 9 February 2020 with a time of 4 hours 56 minutes. The Boeing 747-400 (registration: G-CIVP) operating flight BA112 departed JFK at 18:30 Eastern Standard time on February 8 and landed at Heathrow at 06:25 GMT on February 9.

References

Airline routes
Aviation in London
Aviation in New York City
British Airways
Delta Air Lines
American Airlines
Virgin Atlantic
JetBlue
Heathrow Airport
John F. Kennedy International Airport